Acacia cowleana, Halls Creek wattle, is a northern Australian native shrub. It is a flowering plant with yellow flowers that only open in winter. Its origin is the Northern Australia's dry tropics. It belongs to the genus of Acacia.

Appearance

It is a small tree of height 1–7 metres (6–12 feet) with large grey phyllodes and yellow rod     
flowers. Its bark is fibrous. The phyllodes are 80 to 200 mm long by 10–30 mm wide and curved.

Growth

The shrub grows in woodlands with spinifex at Beulah Station near Enngonia. Its growth is medium-fast. It easily grows from seed but has a short life span. It is a reliable shrub for temperate to arid climates in reasonably well drained soils. Though not generally considered to be endangered, the species is regarded as rare in New South Wales. It is not commonly cultivated, though it is reported to be grown in California.

Aboriginal names and uses
The Walmajarri people of the Paruku IPA in the Kimberley call this wattle parta. Other Aboriginal names are: Alyawarr: ; Anmatyerr: ;  Jaru: . Kaytetye: ; Pintupi Luritja: ; Waramangu: ; and Warlpiri: .

See also
 List of Acacia species

References

cowleana
Flora of New South Wales
Flora of the Northern Territory
Flora of Queensland
Acacias of Western Australia
Fabales of Australia
Shrubs